Evan Thomas Peters (born January 20, 1987) is an American actor. He made his acting debut in the 2004 drama film Clipping Adam and starred in the ABC science fiction series Invasion from 2005 to 2006.

Peters gained wide recognition for playing multiple roles over ten seasons in Ryan Murphy's FX anthology series American Horror Story, from 2011 to 2021. His performance as a detective in the HBO crime miniseries Mare of Easttown (2021) won him a Primetime Emmy Award for Outstanding Supporting Actor. For portraying the titular character in Murphy's Netflix miniseries Dahmer – Monster: The Jeffrey Dahmer Story (2022), he won a Golden Globe Award for Best Actor.

In film, Peters has played a supporting role in the superhero film Kick-Ass (2010), and  Peter Maximoff / Quicksilver in the X-Men film series (2014–2019). He also received a nomination for the BIFA Award for Best Supporting Actor for playing a rebellious student in the heist film American Animals (2018).

Early life 
Evan Thomas Peters was born in St. Louis, Missouri, to parents Julie (née DeWald) and Phillip Peters, and raised in the suburb of Ballwin. His father is a vice president of administration for the Charles Stewart Mott Foundation. His parents are both of German ancestry.

Peters was brought up Catholic and attended a Catholic school. He has an older brother, Andrew, and an older paternal half-sister, Michelle. In 2001, Peters moved with his family to Grand Blanc, Michigan, where he pursued modeling and took local acting classes. He attended Grand Blanc Community High School, before moving to Los Angeles at age 15 with his mother to pursue his acting career. He attended Burbank High School as a sophomore, but later began homeschooling classes.

Career

2004–2010: Career beginnings and Kick Ass
At his second audition, Peters was chosen by producer Michael Picchiottino for the role of Adam Sheppard in the film Clipping Adam. The role earned him the award for Best Breakthrough Performance at the Phoenix Film Festival. He performed in numerous television commercials for Sony PlayStation, Progressive Insurance, Moviefone, Sour Patch Kids, Papa John's Pizza, and Kellogg's.

In 2004, he starred in the MGM film Sleepover as Russell "SpongeBob" Hayes, and appeared in the ABC series The Days as Cooper Day. From 2004 to 2005, he had a recurring role as Seth Wosmer in the first season of the Disney Channel series Phil of the Future. From 2005 to 2006, he portrayed Jesse Varon in the ABC sci-fi thriller series Invasion.

Peters then had supporting roles in the films An American Crime (2007), Gardens of the Night (2008), Never Back Down (2008), and its sequel Never Back Down 2: The Beatdown (2011). He has also starred in several theater plays, including playing Fagin in a production of Oliver Twist at the Met Theater. In 2008, he had a recurring role as Jack Daniels on The CW teen-drama series One Tree Hill. In addition, he landed many one episode guest spots in television series such as The Mentalist, House, Monk, The Office, In Plain Sight, and Parenthood.

In 2010, he appeared in the supporting role of Todd Haynes, the main character's best friend, in the superhero film Kick-Ass. Peters was unable to reprise his role in the 2013 sequel due to scheduling conflicts with his role in the second season of American Horror Story.

2011–present: American Horror Story, Quicksilver and Dahmer 

Peters' breakthrough role was playing the teenager Tate Langdon in the first season of the FX anthology series American Horror Story. In the second season, subtitled Asylum, he starred as Kit Walker, a man wrongly accused of killing his wife; this role earned him a nomination for the Satellite Award for Best Supporting Actor – Series, Miniseries or Television Film.

In the third season, subtitled Coven, he portrayed Kyle Spencer, a frat boy who is killed and brought back to life as a Frankenstein's monster type of creature. In the fourth season of the series, subtitled Freak Show, he played Jimmy Darling, a circus performer with deformed hands.

In 2014, Peters starred in the independent comedy film Adult World, opposite John Cusack and Emma Roberts. Peters played the mutant Peter Maximoff, based on Quicksilver, in the 2014 film X-Men: Days of Future Past and its 2016 sequel, X-Men: Apocalypse. In 2015, Peters starred in the horror film The Lazarus Effect, the drama film Safelight, alongside Juno Temple, and played the role of a wealthy oil businessman and serial killer named James Patrick March in the fifth season of American Horror Story, subtitled Hotel. In 2016 he had a role in the comedy-drama Elvis & Nixon and dual characters Edward Philipe Mott and Rory Monahan in American Horror Story: Roanoke.

2017 saw Peters play the lead in The Pirates of Somalia and earn a Critics' Choice nomination for his performance on American Horror Story: Cult. The next year, Peters played the lead in the heist film American Animals, collaborated once again with Ryan Murphy by acting in the first season of the FX drama Pose, ending the year with the portrayal of several characters in the American Horror Story crossover season, subtitled Apocalypse.

In 2019, he reprised the role of Quicksilver in the sequel film Dark Phoenix. Following The Walt Disney Company's purchase of 21st Century Fox, all X-Men related characters were transferred back to Marvel Studios. In 2021, Peters made a surprise appearance in the Disney+ series WandaVision, portraying an alternate version of his character from the X-Men film series, later revealed to be an imposter named Ralph Bohner. Also that year, Peters starred in Mare of Easttown, an HBO miniseries about a troubled police detective, for which he won the Primetime Emmy Award for Outstanding Supporting Actor in a Limited or Anthology Series. The end of the year saw Peters return to the American Horror Story universe, playing writer and entertainer Austin Sommers in the first part, Red Tide, of the tenth season.

In 2022, Peters portrayed serial killer Jeffrey Dahmer in the Ryan Murphy created Netflix miniseries, Dahmer – Monster: The Jeffrey Dahmer Story.

Personal life 
In 2012, Peters began dating actress Emma Roberts, whom he met on the set of the film Adult World. In July 2013, while they were staying at a hotel in Montreal, Canada, someone overheard a dispute coming from their room and called the police. After a "heated argument," they had begun hitting each other. When the police arrived, they arrested Roberts. Peters was not arrested because Roberts did not have any immediately visible injuries. Peters declined to press charges, and Roberts was released several hours later. In a joint statement, the couple called it "an unfortunate incident and misunderstanding," and stated that they were "working together to move past it." Peters confirmed in March 2014 that he and Roberts were engaged. In March 2019, it was announced that Peters and Roberts had ended the relationship.

Later in September 2019, Peters was pictured with the singer Halsey, and they were confirmed to be dating the following month. The couple were in a relationship until March 2020.

Filmography

Film

Television

Awards and nominations

Notes

References

External links 

 

1987 births
21st-century American male actors
American male film actors
American male television actors
American people of German descent
Living people
People from Grand Blanc, Michigan
Male actors from Michigan
People from Ballwin, Missouri
Male actors from St. Louis
Outstanding Performance by a Supporting Actor in a Miniseries or Movie Primetime Emmy Award winners